Hanuman Prasad is an Indian politician. He was a Member of Legislative Assembly from Surajgarh constituency in Rajasthan. leader of Indian National Congress.

Career
Hanuman Prasad is a retired Indian Administrative Service (IAS) officer and former Chairman of Rajasthan Public Service Commission. He is an Ex- Pramukh of Jhunjhunu zila prishad and former Chairman of State SC Commission.

References

Rajasthan MLAs 1998–2003
Living people
Year of birth missing (living people)
Indian National Congress politicians from Rajasthan